The National Gallery of Victoria Art School, associated with the National Gallery of Victoria, was a private fine arts college founded in 1867 and was Australia's leading art school of 50 years.   

It is also referred to as the 'National Gallery School' ‘National Gallery Art School’, ‘National Gallery School of Art’ and ‘Victorian National Gallery School of Art’. Official correspondence commencing from the 1950s is headed ‘National Gallery of Victoria Art School’ and in McCulloch’s Encyclopedia of Australian Art, it is abbreviated 'NGC School'. 

It was the leading centre for academic art training in Australia until about 1910. Among its luminaries, the school was headed by  Sir William Dargie in 1946–53, John Brack from 1962–68, and Lenton Parr from 1968 to its absorption into the newly created Victorian College of the Arts.

History  

The State Library of Victoria, a public library, opened in Melbourne in 1859, and from 1861 it housed a Museum of Art and a Picture Gallery, opened in 1864, both situated alongside the Public Library on Swanston Street between LaTrobe and Russell Streets. Its art collection was named the National Gallery of Victoria in 1869. 

At the suggestion of Thomas Clark, who was to become teacher of drawing, a National Gallery Art School, School of Design was formed and started enrolling students in June 1867, then was divided into two schools in 1870. Eugene von Guerard, then 60 years old, was appointed Instructor of Painting and Master of the School of Art. Thomas Clark was appointed Instructor and Master of the School of Design which prepared students for the School of Painting, a separate institution. In 1887 the School of Design became the Drawing School. By the turn of the century, its teaching largely followed that of the Academies of Europe. 

Students enrolling were required to demonstrate only rudimentary artistic skill and came from all over the country, paying a very reasonable ten shillings per term (a value of A$40-50 in 2022) in the 1920s. They commenced with drawing in charcoal from plaster casts, before proceeding to working from the nude model. The Museum provided classes in natural history, and students benefitted from ready access to its art collections. Prizes were instituted in 1887 and gradually increased in number and value, the most desirable being the Traveling Scholarship which was later the Keith and Elisabeth Murdoch Travelling Fellowship.

After World War II, ex- servicemen and women training under the Commonwealth Reconstruction Training Scheme (CRTS) were accommodated in a third department. By 1953 the School had reverted to a Drawing School and a Painting School. Among its alumni are counted many of the most prominent Australian artists.

Merger creating the Victorian College of the Arts 
The National Gallery Art School ceased as an independent institution in 1973 when it became the foundation school of the Victorian College of the Arts (VCA) which became an affiliated college of the University of Melbourne in July 1991. On 1 January 1992 an Act of Parliament brought the components of former Prahran College, Victoria College's Prahran Campus and Prahran College of TAFE, under the auspices of Swinburne University of Technology, with the only tertiary courses, Graphics and Industrial Design, remaining on the campus, all others being moved to Deakin University. Prahran Fine Art under Gareth Sansom was relocated and amalgamated with the Victorian College of the Arts, where the next Dean of Art was William Kelly.

As the VCA was not already split into departments, it was the Prahran heads who were given such, newly created, roles in several cases; with Pam Hallandal becoming Head of Drawing (then retiring at the end of 1993); Head of Ceramics was Greg Wain, previously Head of Ceramics at Prahran;  Victor Majzner likewise became Head of Painting at the VCA; Prahran Graduate, Christopher Köller was Head of their new department of Photography. Printmaking had been a separate Department at VCA before the merger, the Head being a Prahran graduate, Allan Mitelman, who was replaced by John Scurry, Head of Printmaking at Prahran. Jock Clutterbuck (VCA) and David Wilson (Prahran) alternated the role of Head of the newly merged Department of Sculpture.

Faculty and Alumni

Heads of the school and teachers of painting
 1870–81: Eugène von Guérard
 1882–91: George Frederick Folingsby
 1891–1935: Lindsay Bernard Hall
 1935–36: William Beckwith McInnes
 1936–45: Charles Wheeler (sculptor)
 1945–46: William Rowell (acting head)
 1946–53: William Dargie
 1948: Hayward Veal (deputy)
 1953–54: Murray Griffin (acting)
 1954–62: Alan Sumner
 1963–68: John Brack

Teachers of drawing, assistant heads of school 
 1870–76: Thomas Clark
 1876–86: Oswald Rose Campbell
 1886–1917: Frederick McCubbin
 1907–08: Leslie Wilkie (acting)
 1917–39: William Beckwith Mcinnes
 1933: George Bell (acting)
 1939–41: A. E. Newbury
 1941–46: William Rowell
 1946–53: Murray Griffin
 1954–55: Charles Bush
 1956–61: Rod Clark
 1961–62: Ian Armstrong
 1962–68: *Marc Clark

Alumni

The School's graduates and former students, with their dates of attendance, include:

References 

Art schools in Australia
Australian art
1867 in art
1867 establishments in Australia
1973 disestablishments in Australia